Santoshpur is a neighbourhood in the southern part of Kolkata, India. It is loosely bounded by Garfa to the north, the Eastern Metropolitan Bypass to the east, Jadavpur to the west and Baghajatin to the south.

History of Santoshpur area

From the 1950s
This area was initially part of Jadavpur. The area was mainly shallow marshy lands and agricultural fields even as late as the seventies. Some houses were built in the fifties and sixties mostly on the eastern side of the Jadavpur Rail Station. Residents are mostly East Bengali refugees.

Transport
Jyotirindra Nath Nandi metro station and Satyajit Ray metro station, under construction on the Kavi Subhas-Biman Bandar route (Kolkata Metro Line 6), would serve Santoshpur, Ajoy Nagar, Survey Park areas lying close to the E.M. Bypass section of the city.

References

Neighbourhoods in Kolkata